Each national team submitted a squad of 20 players, two of whom had to be goalkeepers.

Ages are as of the start of the tournament, 16 July 2019.

Group A

France

Head Coach: Gilles Eyquem

Netherlands

Head Coach: Jessica Torny

Norway

Head Coach: Nils Lexerød

Scotland

Head Coach: Pauline Hamill

Group B

Belgium

Head Coach: Xavier Donnay

England

Head Coach: Rehanne Skinner

Germany

Head Coach: Maren Meinert

Spain

Head Coach: Pedro López

References

squads
UEFA Women's Under-19 Championship squads